John Thomas Henn (October 2, 1941 – March 22, 2020), also known as Jack Henn, was an American volleyball player who competed in the 1968 Summer Olympics. He was born in Evansville, Indiana. He died on March 22, 2020.

References

1941 births
2020 deaths
American men's volleyball players
Olympic volleyball players of the United States
Volleyball players at the 1968 Summer Olympics
Sportspeople from Evansville, Indiana
Volleyball players at the 1967 Pan American Games
Pan American Games gold medalists for the United States
Pan American Games medalists in volleyball
Volleyball players from Indiana
Medalists at the 1967 Pan American Games
San Diego State Aztecs men's volleyball players